Daliang (Mandarin: 大两镇) is a town in Wangcang County, Guangyuan, Sichuan, China. In 2010, Daliang had a total population of 5,240: 2,723 males and 2,697 females: 1,566 aged under 14, 3,156 aged between 15 and 65 and 708 aged over 65.

See also 
 List of township-level divisions of Sichuan

References 

Towns in Sichuan
Divisions of Wangcang County